William Troughton (born 1984) is a British actor.

Career
Since 2014 he has played the part of Tom Archer in the long-running BBC Radio 4 programme The Archers. His father David Troughton plays Tom's father Tony Archer.

In 2012, he played Harry Robinson in Graham Linehan's play The Ladykillers, based on the 1955 film, in a touring production after understudying in its West End production.

In the 2013 supernatural thriller film Armistice, Troughton played "a demon/mutant/zombie" named in the credits as "The Fallen".

In 2014, he performed Private Peaceful, adapted and directed by Simon Reade from Michael Morpurgo's children's World War I novel, at the Tobacco Factory, Bristol. In 2016 he played Jim / Tom in Clybourne Park at Richmond Theatre.

His television appearances have included Inspector George Gently, Doctors, Silk and The Crimson Field'''

Personal life
Troughton's grandfather was Patrick Troughton (1920–1987) who played the Second Doctor in Doctor Who'' from 1966 to 1969. His brother Sam is also an actor and his brother Jim is a cricketer.

Troughton enjoys playing cricket, as does his character Tom Archer.

References

External links

1984 births
Living people
British male radio actors
British male stage actors
British male television actors
The Archers
21st-century British male actors
Troughton family